Scream (also known as Scream: The TV Series) is an American anthology slasher television series developed by Jill Blotevogel, Dan Dworkin and Jay Beattie for MTV and Brett Matthews for VH1. It is based on the slasher film series of the same name created by Kevin Williamson and Wes Craven. The series is produced by Dimension Television and MTV Production Development, and was formerly filmed in Louisiana, in locations such as Baton Rouge and New Orleans. Blotevogel and Jaime Paglia originally served as showrunners during the first season before being replaced by Michael Gans and Richard Register in the second season, because of creative differences.

The first two seasons were situated in the fictional town of Lakewood, where a string of murders took place. At the center of those murders was Emma Duval (played by Willa Fitzgerald), a teenage girl who is somehow tied to the town's dark past. The series premiered on June 30, 2015, on MTV and concluded its first season on September 1, 2015. The series was officially picked up for a second season in July 2015. After its second season concluded, a two-hour Halloween special aired in October 2016.

In October 2016, MTV renewed the series for a third season. In April 2017, MTV announced that they were rebooting the series with the third season, with a new cast and setting. As part of the reboot process, it was revealed that Brett Matthews would be serving as the main showrunner. In addition, Queen Latifah, Shakim Compere and Yaneley Arty would be added as executive producers for the series under Flavor Unit Entertainment. RJ Cyler, C. J. Wallace, Tyga, Keke Palmer, Jessica Sula, Giorgia Whigham, Giullian Yao Gioiello and Tyler Posey starred in the rebooted third season. In June 2019, it was announced that the series would be moving to VH1 ahead of the premiere of the third season. The third and final season, subtitled Resurrection, premiered on July 8, 2019.

Premise 
Scream is a serialized anthology series that follows a group of teenagers being stalked and targeted by a masked serial killer. 

The first two seasons, set in the fictional town of Lakewood, follow the story of Emma Duval, a teenage girl, who is linked to the horrific events of the town's past. As the killer's main obsession starts to take a hold after a brutal murder in the present, Emma finds herself in the center of imminent peril. With both her family and friends in danger, she sets out to uncover the town's dark mysteries and unmask the identity of the Lakewood Slasher.

The third season follows the story of Deion Elliot, a local football star in Atlanta, who is tormented by the events of his tragic past. As Ghostface uses his darkest secrets against him and continues with a killing spree, Deion not only stands to lose his future, but also, the lives of his friends and family members, who might end up being potential victims of the notorious and infamous killer.

Cast and characters

Main (seasons 1–2) 
 Willa Fitzgerald as Emma Duval, a popular high school student and local barista who becomes the primary target of the Lakewood Slasher. In the second season, she develops PTSD as a result of the first season's events.
 Bex Taylor-Klaus as Audrey Jensen, a sarcastic, bicurious filmmaker who had a falling out with Emma during their childhood
 John Karna as Noah Foster, a witty and intelligent nerd who has a vast knowledge about horror films. In the second season, he runs a podcast dedicated to the Lakewood murders. 
 Amadeus Serafini as Kieran Wilcox, a new student who becomes Emma's main love interest
 Connor Weil as Will Belmont (season 1), a poor but popular basketball player and Emma's ex-boyfriend
 Carlson Young as Brooke Maddox, a wealthy and popular, but troubled, student and the daughter of Lakewood's mayor
 Jason Wiles as Clark Hudson (season 1), Kieran's biological father and the sheriff of Lakewood. He develops a relationship with Emma's mother, Maggie.
 Tracy Middendorf as Maggie Duval, Emma's mother and the Lakewood medical examiner. She conceals her history with Brandon James.
 Kiana Brown as Zoe Vaughn (season 2), an overachieving intellect who harbors a secret. She becomes Noah's new love interest in the second season. 
 Santiago Segura as Stavo Acosta (season 2), a new student and skilled artist who is interested in the horror genre, serial killers and comic books. He is the son of sheriff Acosta and becomes Brooke's new love interest in the second season.
 Tom Maden as Jake Fitzgerald, a wealthy and popular but mischievous basketball player, Brooke's on-and-off boyfriend, and Will's former best friend

Recurring (seasons 1–2) 
 Bobby Campo as Seth Branson, a teacher who has a secret relationship with Brooke in the first season
 Brianne Tju as Riley Marra (season 1), a popular, cheerful student and a best friend of Emma and Brooke. She becomes Noah's main love interest in the first season. 
 Bella Thorne as Nina Patterson (season 1), a wealthy and popular, but rude and possibly sociopathic student who is the first victim in the series, and whose gruesome murder sparks the events of the first two seasons
 Amelia Rose Blaire as Piper Shaw (season 1; guest season 2), a podcaster who comes to Lakewood to investigate the recent murders
 Mike Vaughn as the voice of the Lakewood Slasher
 Vaughn also voices the Shallow Grove Slasher during the two-part Halloween special.
 Bryan Batt as Mayor Quinn Maddox, Brooke's father and the mayor of Lakewood. He hides secrets from the town that surround illegal business deals and cover-ups.
 Sosie Bacon as Rachel Murray (season 1; guest season 2), Audrey's girlfriend who attends an all-girls' catholic school. She has suicidal intentions as a result of bullying. 
 Sophina Brown as Lorraine Brock (season 1), a detective assigned to the Lakewood murders case and a previous lover of Sheriff Hudson
 Tom Everett Scott as Kevin Duval (season 2; guest season 1), Emma's estranged father and Maggie's ex-husband. In the second season, he attempts to reconnect with Emma. 
 Anthony Ruivivar as Miguel Acosta (season 2), the new, competent and experienced sheriff who returns to his childhood home of Lakewood. He is the single father of Stavo. 
 Austin Highsmith as Kristen Lang (season 2), an idealistic high school psychology teacher who becomes a confidant and mentor to her students. She is in a secret relationship with Seth Branson in the second season. 
 Sean Grandillo as Eli Hudson (season 2), Kieran's cousin with an undisclosed knowledge of his past. He presents a squeaky clean image but has ulterior motives. He takes an interest in Emma. 
 Karina Logue as Tina Hudson (season 2), Eli's mother and Kieran's aunt, who becomes Kieran's legal guardian after the events of the first season. She is proper and polite but with a grifter's sense of self-reliance.
 Mary Katherine Duhon as Haley Meyers (season 2), an outspoken classmate who strongly dislikes Emma and Audrey

Main (Scream: Resurrection) 
 RJ Cyler as Deion Elliot, a successful, star football player who becomes the primary target of Ghostface
 Cyler also portrays Marcus Elliot, Deion's deceased twin brother, for a single episode.
 Jessica Sula as Olivia "Liv" Reynolds, a recently new student prior to the events of the series who becomes Deion's main love interest. She is a cheerleader, honor roll student, and daughter of a police officer.
 Giorgia Whigham as Beth, an outspoken goth student and tattoo artist. She is extremely fond of horror films.
 C. J. Wallace as Amir Ayoub, a good-natured student who aspires to pursue music, but is forced to work in the family business as a result of his strict parents. He develops a relationship with Beth.		
 Tyga as Jamal "Jay" Elliot, Deion's older, half-brother who associates with tough and potentially dangerous individuals
 Tyler Posey as Shane, a high school dropout who works as both drug dealer and party promoter. He has a sexual relationship with Beth.
 Keke Palmer as Kym, a bold, rebellious student and dedicated social activist

Recurring (Scream: Resurrection) 
 Roger L. Jackson as the voice of Ghostface
 Tony Todd as Hook Man, a deranged, mysterious man who lives in an abandoned car lot. Deion believes he killed Marcus.
 Giullian Yao Gioiello as Manny, an intelligent, asthmatic, gay student and Kym's best friend
 Mary J. Blige as Sherry Elliot, Deion's mother who often worries about the pressure of his future career in football
 Diesel Madkins as Earl Elliot, Deion's distant father and a trucker
 Gideon Emery as T. Reynolds, Liv's strict, controlling father and a police officer
 Patrick Johnson as Avery Collins, Liv's ex-boyfriend and Deion's rival on the football team
 Drew Starkey as Hawkins, a friend of Deion on the football team
 Terrence J as Coach Griffin, Deion's football coach

Episodes

Production

Development 
In June 2012, it was reported that MTV was in the early stages of developing a weekly television series based on the Scream film franchise. In April 2013, The Hollywood Reporter confirmed that MTV had greenlit the pilot episode, with Wes Craven in talks to direct. In July 2013, it was reported that Jay Beattie and Dan Dworkin had officially boarded the project to write the pilot script and in April 2014, it was reported by TVLine that the series would be penned by Jill Blotevogel. In August 2014, the series announced its cast as well as the director of the pilot episode, Jamie Travis. The series was originally planned to debut in mid-2014, however, this was changed to summer 2015.

An official promotional picture of the series' re-imagined mask was revealed in early June 2015. Initially, Craven expressed his approval of the redesign and hinted at its origins and possible plot significance. However, Craven was later critical about the network's decision to abandon the Ghostface mask in the television series. Later, it was reported that there were preliminary discussions about incorporating the mask in the first two seasons. However, the initial plans were scrapped in favor of a new mask, due to creative reasons. Sometime after the announcement of the reboot, MTV made a deal with Fun World, in order to acquire the licensing rights to the Ghostface mask for the series.

On April 12, 2015, the first trailer for the series was aired during the 2015 MTV Movie Awards presented by Bella Thorne, also revealing the series' premiere date on June 30.

The series was officially picked up for a second season on July 29, 2015. On November 9, 2015, it was announced that Jill Blotevogel and Jaime Paglia would be stepping down as showrunners due to creative differences, although Blotevogel would remain a consultant on the series. Michael Gans and Richard Register replaced them for the second season. On May 2, 2016, the official trailer for the second season was released. The second-season premiere date was changed to May 30, 2016. On October 14, 2016, MTV renewed the series for a six-episode third season, and announced that the showrunners would be replaced again.

On April 26, 2017, MTV announced that Queen Latifah would be an executive producer for the third season of Scream. The series underwent a reboot with a new cast and Brett Matthews serving as showrunner. In addition, it was announced that Matthews, Shakim Compere and Yaneley Arty would also be credited as executive producers for the series under Flavor Unit Entertainment. On July 19, 2017, The Hollywood Reporter announced that the series would transition into an anthology series in the third season. This information was corroborated by MTV president Chris McCarthy.

On September 18, 2017, it was announced that the Ghostface mask from the film series would be making an appearance in the third season. On October 10, 2017, Keke Palmer confirmed in an interview that Roger L. Jackson, who voiced Ghostface in the film series, would return for the third season, replacing Mike Vaughn, who served as the voice for two characters, the Lakewood Slasher in the first two seasons and the Shallow Grove Slasher in the Halloween special episodes of the second season.

On March 28, 2018, it was confirmed that Harvey Weinstein would not be credited as an executive producer in the third season, due to a series of sexual assault allegations. In addition, the series would not include The Weinstein Company or its logo in its credits from the third season onward, even though the company was formerly involved in the distribution of the series.

On June 24, 2019, it was confirmed that the third season was scheduled to premiere over three nights on VH1, starting from July 8, 2019. On July 1, 2019, the official trailer for Scream: Resurrection was released.

Casting 
On August 5, 2014, both the main cast and recurring cast were announced. However, Amy Forsyth dropped out and was replaced by Bex Taylor-Klaus as Audrey Jensen. On December 11, 2014, it was revealed that Bella Thorne would be a part of the cast, she played the character Nina Patterson. Thorne confirmed this during an interview saying, "Yes it's true. I will re-enact the famous scene of Drew Barrymore in the original series." On February 22, 2015, it was revealed that Joel Gretsch, who was playing Clark Hudson, had left the series as producers thought his character should go down a different path; he was replaced by Jason Wiles. On April 22, 2015, True Blood actress Amelia Rose Blaire was confirmed to be joining the series as Piper Shaw which, by the character description, is a role similar to Gale Weathers from the Scream films.

On June 18, 2015, Bella Thorne confirmed she was offered the lead role in the series but turned it down in favor of a smaller role. She went on to explain, "I had the option to do the lead, but I thought I should choose this role because I felt it was more iconic, I thought it was just a little bit more and also I've never been killed on screen before. I've never been killed ever on anything that I've done. I've always been the character that lives at the end so it was my first time dying on screen which is pretty cool. I wouldn't say that my character isn't necessarily in any more of the episodes but you'll see!" In 2016, Lele Pons appeared in a similar cameo capacity in the beginning of the second season. The scene paid homage to Scream 2, with Pons' character Leah, an actress from the in-show film Murderville, being thrown off a house by a killer, Becca (Chelsea Bruland).

It was announced on July 17, 2017, that Tyga and C. J. Wallace would star in the rebooted third season. On September 13, 2017, it was announced that RJ Cyler, Jessica Sula, Keke Palmer, Giullian Yao Gioiello, and Giorgia Whigham had joined the main cast of the third season in addition to the previously announced cast members. On September 25, 2017, it was announced that Tyler Posey had been cast as a series regular in the role of Shane. Posey previously appeared in the series' promo titled "Killer Party", playing a fictionalized version of himself. On August 16, 2018, it was announced that Mary J. Blige had been cast in the role of Deion's mother, Sherry Elliot. On October 12, 2018, it was announced that Tony Todd would appear as Luther Thompson / Hook Man. On June 24, 2019, it was confirmed that Paris Jackson would make an appearance as the character Becky in the third season's first episode "The Deadfast Club". Similar to Thorne and Pons, Paris Jackson will make a cameo in the opening scene of the third season's first episode, paying homage to the opening of the original film.

Filming 
The first season was filmed in Baton Rouge, Louisiana. The second season was filmed in New Orleans, Louisiana. Filming of season one took place from April through July 2015. Filming for the second season began on February 16, 2016. Filming for the third season began on September 18, 2017, and concluded on November 11, 2017, in Atlanta, Georgia.

Music 

Two official soundtrack albums have been released by MTV. The first season's soundtrack was released on August 14, 2015, under Columbia Records. The second season's soundtrack was released on July 29, 2016, under Island Records. The score soundtrack for the series' first two seasons composed by Jeremy Zuckerman, was released by Lakeshore Records on October 28, 2016.

Scream After Dark 
Scream After Dark is a talk show hosted by Jeffery Self, which features behind the scenes footage, and guests discussing episodes of Scream. The first instalment followed the season two premiere and featured Willa Fitzgerald, Bex Taylor-Klaus, John Karna, Amadeus Serafini, Carlson Young, and Kiana Brown, and received 185,000 viewers. The second instalment aired following episode eight and featured Fitzgerald, Taylor-Klaus, Karna, Young, Brown, Santiago Segura, and Sean Grandillo, and received 201,000 viewers. The third and final installment aired following the season two finale and featured Fitzgerald, Taylor-Klaus, Karna, Young, and Serafini, and averaged 145,000 viewers.

Web series 
Scream: If I Die is a web series about the six survivors of Lakewood are recorded a video to share their last words and thoughts, before one of them will be murdered by a new Lakewood Slasher killer, leading the events of the second season.

Broadcast 
Scream premiered on June 30, 2015, on MTV in the United States. The first season concluded on September 1, 2015. Internationally, Netflix acquired the exclusive international broadcast rights to the series, making the entire first season available on October 1, 2015, on its platform, as an original series. In the United States, the first season was released on Netflix on May 13, 2016.

The second season premiered on May 30, 2016, and concluded on August 16, 2016, on MTV in the United States. It was followed by a two-hour Halloween special that aired on October 18, 2016. Internationally, Netflix released episodes weekly, less than a day after their original U.S. broadcast. In the United States, the second season was released on Netflix on September 30, 2016.

The third and final season, subtitled Resurrection, premiered over three nights on VH1 in the United States, starting on July 8, 2019, and concluded on July 10, 2019. On July 17, 2018, The Hollywood Reporter confirmed that in the midst of Lantern Entertainment's acquisition of the assets of The Weinstein Company, a former output deal between The Weinstein Company and Netflix was terminated. As a result, the third season was not broadcast on Netflix internationally. In the United States, the third season was released on Netflix on September 1, 2019.

Reception

Critical response 

The first season of Scream received an overall mixed response. On review aggregation website Rotten Tomatoes, the first season received an approval rating of 52% based on 42 reviews, with a 5.45/10 average rating. The site's critical consensus reads: "Lacking truly compelling characters or scenarios, Scream is formed to trade too heavily on nostalgia for its big-screen predecessors in the franchise." On Metacritic, which assigns a normalized rating, the first season has a weighted average score of 57 out of 100, based on reviews from 21 critics, indicating "mixed or average reviews".

In a positive review, David Hinckley from New York Daily News awarded the pilot four out of five stars and stated, "Happily, Scream maintains a sense of humor, reinforced with snappy, self-aware pop culture dialogue." Similarly, Brian Lowry of Variety commended the series' ability to maintain suspense "without much actually happening during the rest of the episode," noting its use of music, but expressing skepticism if the series could maintain its originality. Aedan Juvet of PopWrapped gave a positive assessment of the series and called it, "a prime example of a game-changing horror series". Conversely, David Wiegand of the San Francisco Chronicle panned the series and gave it one out of four stars, criticizing the acting performances as "bland, robotic, and uninteresting" as well as its apparent lack of racial diversity. In a mixed review, Mark Perigard of the Boston Herald gave the series a C+, saying, "There are a few scares here, but while the Scream films kept audiences jumping, Scream: The TV Series risks putting viewers to sleep."

The second season received more positive reviews with an approval rating of 92% on Rotten Tomatoes based on reviews from 12 critics. The site's critical consensus reads: "Undeniably gripping and wickedly sharp, Scream returns with a killer sophomore season that manages to go further into its murderous ethos."

The third season received mixed reviews, with an approval rating of 40% on Rotten Tomatoes based on reviews from 5 critics. "The cast this year is much more diverse,"' Karen Rought of Hypable wrote, "Scream season 3 shines in its character portrayal but falls flat with the horror." Opposing, Paul Dailly of TV Fanatic wrote, "This new killer is just as creative as the ones from the movie series."

Ratings

Awards and nominations

Notes

References

External links 

 
 Scream on Netflix
 

 
2015 American television series debuts
2019 American television series endings
2010s American high school television series
2010s American horror television series
2010s American mystery television series
2010s American teen drama television series
2010s American anthology television series
English-language television shows
Horror drama television series
VH1 original programming
MTV original programming
Adaptations of works by Wes Craven
American horror fiction television series
Television series set in the 2010s
Metafictional television series
Serial killers in television
Sororicide in fiction
Lesbian-related television shows
Live action television shows based on films
Television series by The Weinstein Company
Television series about teenagers
Television shows about death
Television shows filmed in Georgia (U.S. state)
Television shows filmed in Atlanta
Television shows set in Atlanta
Television shows filmed in Louisiana
Television shows filmed in New Orleans
Television shows set in the United States